The World Hockey Association (WHA) operated for seven seasons from 1972 until 1979.

The WHA ceased operations after the 1978–79 season. As part of the NHL-WHA merger, four WHA franchises moved to the National Hockey League for the 1979–80 NHL season: Edmonton, New England (renamed Hartford Whalers), Quebec, and Winnipeg. The other two WHA-enfranchised teams, Birmingham and Cincinnati, folded.

See also
Avco World Trophy
List of NHL seasons